Bangladesh Parjatan Corporation (BPC) is a statutory board under the Ministry of Civil Aviation & Tourism of Bangladesh, tasked to promote the tourism industry of the country. It is the National Tourism Organization of the country. Recently Bangladesh Government has formed Tourist Police unit to better protect local and foreign tourists as well as look after the nature and wildlife in the tourist spots.

Establishment
The Board of Bangladesh Parjatan Corporation, was established 
in the year 1973 consists of a chairman and 3 whole- time Directors. According to the Bangladesh Parjatan Corporation Order 1972, the purpose of the board are

 It shall be the function of the corporation to promote and develop tourism, provide facilities, undertake measures and carry out all forms of activities connected with or ancillary to tourism.
 To promote tourist undertakings and to control and regulate tourist installations and services.
 To organise reception and information facilities in or outside Bangladesh.
 To create tourism awareness among the people.
 To establish institutes for instruction and training of potential tourism personnel.

Functions
The corporation performs following functions:
 To promote and develop tourism.
 To establish tourism infrastructures in Bangladesh.
 To provide facilities to undertake measures and carry out all kinds of activities connected with tourism
 To acquire, establish, construct, arrange, provide and run hotels, restaurants, rest houses, picnic spots, camping sites, theatres, amusement parks and facilities for water skiing and entertainment.
 To establish institutes for instruction and training of potential tourism personnel.

References

External links
 Official website
 Tourism in Bangladesh

Tourism in Bangladesh
Government agencies of Bangladesh
1973 establishments in Bangladesh
Organizations established in 1973
Organisations based in Dhaka
Tourism agencies
Government-owned companies of Bangladesh